Guacolda Antoine Lazzerini (11 April 1908 – 22 August 2015) was a Chilean mathematician and teacher of mathematics.

Education and career
Antoine's father died when Antoine was a teenager, and she began helping to support the family by teaching mathematics. She entered the teaching school of the University of Chile in 1924, and finished her studies there in 1928, earning the title of professor of mathematics and physics with a thesis on differential equations and their application in pedagogy and engineering. She became a high school mathematics teacher at the Liceo José Victorino Lastarria (Santiago), and continued to teach there for the next 30 years.

In 1933 she became an assistant professor at the University of Chile, and by 1954 she was promoted to full professor there. She also helped found The Kent School, a private school in Santiago, in 1953. From 1958 to 1962 she held a position at the UTE equivalent to that of a dean, the first woman at that level in UTE, and from 1963 to 1968 she was head of the mathematics department in the faculty of philosophy and education at the University of Chile. In the 1950s and 1960s she also represented Chile in several international events concerning mathematics teaching. She retired in 1985, but remained active in mathematics long afterward.

Book
In 1971, Antoine coauthored the book Nuevas Matematicas Para Los Padres [New Mathematics for Parents], with María Lara. It concerned New Math and set theory, subjects popular in mathematics education at the time.

Personal life
Antoine was born on 11 April 1908 in Santiago, one of seven children in a family of immigrants; her mother was from Italy and her father from France, both emigrating to Chile as children in the occupation of Araucanía of the late 18th century. In 1944 she married Arcadio Escobar Zapata, a high school inspector and law student; they had two children. She died on 22 August 2015.

Recognition
In 1992, Antoine was a nominee for the National Education Award. Antoine was honored by the Agrupación de Mujeres Ingenieros in 1997, as part of their celebration of International Women's Day.

References

External links
Pionera Guacolda Antoine Lazzerini, Blogspot

1908 births
2015 deaths
20th-century Chilean mathematicians
Chilean centenarians
Chilean women scientists
Women mathematicians
Women centenarians
Mathematics educators
University of Chile alumni
Academic staff of the University of Chile